The Dunedin Range is a northwest-trending mountain range, 37 km (23 mi) long and 3 to 6 km (2 to 4 mi) wide, located 8 km east of Lyttelton Range in the Admiralty Mountains of Victoria Land, Antarctica. Mapped by USGS from surveys and U.S. Navy air photos, 1960–63. This topographical feature lies situated on the Pennell Coast, a portion of Antarctica lying between Cape Williams and Cape Adare.

Named by US-ACAN for the city of Dunedin, New Zealand which over the years has had a close association with Antarctic expeditions; also in recognition of the friendship and cooperation of its citizens with American participation in the U.S. Antarctic Research Program.

References

Admiralty Mountains
Pennell Coast